

Results
Arsenal's score comes first

Football League Second Division

Final League table

FA Cup

References

1913-14
English football clubs 1913–14 season